Potential is the fourth studio album by Scar Tissue, released independently on October 10, 2008. It was released after a ten year hiatus the band went on after the release of their 1998 remix album Rebuild.

Track listing

Personnel
Adapted from the Potential liner notes.

Scar Tissue
 Philip Caldwell – guitar, programming, vocals
 Steve Watkins – bass guitar, programming, vocals

Additional performers
 Brooke Fletcher – vocals (3)
 Tracy Waugh – vocals (3)

Release history

References

External links 
 Potential at Bandcamp
 

2008 albums
Scar Tissue (band) albums